Aemene taprobanis is a moth of the family Erebidae. It was described by Francis Walker in 1854. It is found in China (Li-Kiang), the north-western Himalayas, India (Sikkim, Assam, Mumbai), Sri Lanka and Malacca.

Description
Head and thorax grey. Tegula usually with a black speck. Forewings grey, more or less suffused with fuscous. Waved sub-basal, antemedial, medial and postmedial black lines present. Postmedial lines excurved round the end of cell and then bent inwards to near the medial band and with some diffused streaks beyond it. A series of marginal specks and a black spot at center of cell and another at end of it. Hindwings pale and more or less suffused with fuscous.

Subspecies
Aemene taprobanis taprobanis
Aemene taprobanis likiangensis (Daniel, 1951) (China: Li-Kiang)

References

Cisthenina
Moths described in 1854
Moths of Asia